Indonesia competed in the 2022 World Games in Birmingham, United States, from 7 to 17 July 2022. The games were originally scheduled for July 2021, but were postponed due to the rescheduling of the Tokyo 2020 Olympic Games. Athletes representing Indonesia won two gold medals and three silver medals. The country finished in 25th place in the medal table.

Competitors
The following is the list of number of competitors in the Games.

Medalists

Sport climbing

Indonesia entered two climbers into the world games competition. Veddriq Leonardo and Kiromal Katibin secured their place after being in the top three of the 2021 World Cup ranking.

Speed

Wushu

Indonesia qualified four athletes into this tournament. 2019 world championship and 2019 Southeast Asian Games gold medalist Edgar Xavier Marvelo and Harris Horatius will compete with Nandhira Mauriskha and Alisya Mellynar.

See also
2022 World Games

References

Nations at the 2022 World Games
World Games
Indonesia at multi-sport events